Softwood is wood from gymnosperm trees such as conifers. The term is opposed to hardwood, which is the wood from angiosperm trees. The main differences between hardwoods and softwoods is that the structure of hardwoods lack resin canals, whereas softwoods lack pores (though not all softwoods have resin canals).

Characteristics

Softwood is wood from gymnosperm trees such as pines and spruces. Softwoods are not necessarily softer than hardwoods. In both groups there is an enormous variation in actual wood hardness, the range of density in hardwoods completely including that of softwoods.  Some hardwoods (e.g. balsa) are softer than most softwoods, while the hardest hardwoods are much harder than any softwood. The woods of longleaf pine, Douglas fir, and yew are much harder in the mechanical sense than several hardwoods.

Softwoods are generally most used by the construction industry and are also used to produce paper pulp, and card products. In many of these applications, there is a constant need for density and thickness monitoring and gamma-ray sensors have shown good performance in this case.

Certain species of softwood are more resistant to insect attack from woodworm, as certain insects prefer damp hardwood.

Examples of softwood trees and uses
 Douglas fir - joinery, doors and heavy construction
 Eastern white pine - furniture
 European spruce - used throughout construction, panelling and cladding
 Larch - cladding and boats
 Lodgepole pine - roofing, flooring and in making chipboard and particle board
 Monterey pine
 Parana pine - stair treads and joinery
 Scots pine - construction industry, mostly for interior work
 Sitka spruce - 
 Southern yellow pine - joinery, flooring and decking
 Western hemlock - doors, joinery and furniture
 Western red cedar (or red cedar) - furniture, decking, cladding, and roof shingles 
 Yew - interior and exterior furniture e.g. chairs, gate posts and wood turning

Applications
Softwood is the source of about 80% of the world's production of timber, with traditional centres of production being the Baltic region (including Scandinavia and Russia), North America and China. Softwood is typically used in construction as structural carcassing timber, as well as finishing timber.

See also
List of woods
 United States – Canada softwood lumber dispute
Hardwood
Janka hardness test
Brinell scale

References 

Forestry
Timber industry
Wood products
Woodworking
softwood